French Leave is a 1937 British comedy film directed by Norman Lee and starring Betty Lynne, Edmund Breon and John Longden. It was based on a play by Reginald Berkeley which had previously been made into a film of the same title in 1930. It was made at Welwyn Studios.

Cast
 Betty Lynne as Dorothy Glennister
 Edmund Breon as Colonel Root
 John Longden as Lt. Glennister
 John Wickham as Lt. Graham
 Arthur Hambling as Corporal Sykes
 Frederick Burtwell as Nobby
 Michael Morel as Jules Marnier
 Margaret Yarde as Dernaux

References

Bibliography
 Low, Rachael. Filmmaking in 1930s Britain. George Allen & Unwin, 1985.
 Wood, Linda. British Films, 1927-1939. British Film Institute, 1986.

External links

1937 films
1937 comedy films
1930s English-language films
British comedy films
Films directed by Norman Lee
Films set in the 1910s
British films based on plays
Films shot at Welwyn Studios
Remakes of British films
British black-and-white films
1930s British films